Jerzy Bechka (October 16, 1915 - December 21, 2004) was an Orientalist and Iranologist from Czechoslovakia.

Biography 
He studied law and Charles University in Prague. Nevertheless because of World War II, he received his doctorate very late, in 1945. After World War II, he and a few of his friends founded a new magazine, Nový Orient (the New East Orient).

He also studied at Charles University School of Philosophy and received a doctorate in this field. From 1952 to 1976 he retired from the Institute of Oriental Studies at the Czechoslovak Academy of Sciences. The subject of his studies was the history and culture of Iran, Tajikistan and Afghanistan, as well as the history of Iranian studies in Czech and Slovak. Bechka has written numerous books and articles on Persian literature and has translated some works of this language from Persian into Czech. His research has been published in several European languages.

Works
 Afghánistán, Praha: NPL, 1965.
 A Study in Pashto Stress, Prague: Academia, 1969.
 Táríhi adabijáti tágíkistán, Přel. z angl. do urdštiny Kabír Ahmad Ğájsí, Dihlí: Anğumani teraqíji urdú, 1977.
 Spisovatel a učenec Sadriddín Ajní, Praha: Academia, 1978.
 Úvod do paštského jazyka, Praha: Academia, 1979.
 Íránský svět v české a slovenské literatuře a vědě: čs. bibliografie íránských lit., Praha: Sdružení českých překladatelů při Českém literárním fondu, 1988
 Adabíját-e fársí dar Tádžíkestán (Persische Literatur in Tadschikistan), Tehrán: Markaz-e motáleát va tahqíqát-e farhanqí-je sejnolmelalí, 1993.
 Iranica bohemica et slovaca: litterae, Praha: Akademie věd České republiky, Orientální ústav, 1996.
 Islám a české země,  Votobia, Olomouc 1998.
 Persko-český slovník, sestavil Jiří Bečka; upravil a doplnil redakční kolektiv: Mohammad Hassani, Mehdi Meshkato-Dini, Petr Pelikán, Velvyslanectví Íránské islámské republiky v Praze, 2004.

References 

Iranologists
2004 deaths
1915 births
Czechoslovak academics
Charles University alumni